An annular solar eclipse occurred on December 2, 1937. A solar eclipse occurs when the Moon passes between Earth and the Sun, thereby totally or partly obscuring the image of the Sun for a viewer on Earth. An annular solar eclipse occurs when the Moon's apparent diameter is smaller than the Sun's, blocking most of the Sun's light and causing the Sun to look like an annulus (ring). An annular eclipse appears as a partial eclipse over a region of the Earth thousands of kilometres wide. Annularity was visible from Ogasawara, Tokyo and South Seas Mandate (the part now belonging to Marshall Islands) in Japan, and Gilbert and Ellice Islands (the part now belonging to Kiribati).

The duration of annularity at maximum eclipse (closest to but slightly shorter than the longest duration) was 12 minutes, 0.33 seconds in the Pacific Ocean. It was the longest annular solar eclipse since December 25, 1628, but the Solar eclipse of December 14, 1955 lasted longer.

Related eclipses

Solar eclipses 1935–1938

Saros 141

Tritos series

Notes

References

External links 

1937 12 2
1937 in science
1937 12 2
December 1937 events